Owl Goingback (born May 1, 1959, in St. Louis) is the pen name of an American author of horror fiction.

Biography
In his biographical statements, Goingback writes that was born May 1, 1959, in St. Louis, MO and that his mother's name was Quiet Starr. He dropped out of high school his senior year to join the United States Air Force and later attended Embry–Riddle Aeronautical University. On January 5, 1978, Goingback married Nancy Santos Bello, with whom he has two sons: Jason and Michael.

From 1976 to 1981, Goingback served as a jet engine mechanic in the United States Air Force, where he became a sergeant. He received a good conduct medal and Air Force Longevity Service Award. After leaving the military, Goingback owned and managed a restaurant in Georgia called Jim's Place from 1981-1986, after which he devoted himself to writing full-time.

In addition to writing novels, children's stories, scripts, and other documents under his own name, he writes that he  "has ghostwritten for Hollywood celebrities", and that he travels throughout the United States lecturing about "the customs and folklore of the American Indians" and has worked as a model and actor.

Goingback presently lives in Florida with his wife and sons.

Awards

Bibliography
Crota (1996)
Eagle feathers (1997)
The Gift (1997)
Shaman Moon (1997)
Darker Than Night (1999)
Evil Whispers (2001)
Breed (2002)
Coyote Rage (2019)

See also
List of horror fiction authors

References

External links
Owl Goingback's Official Site
Bibliography on Fantastic Fiction
Buried.com Interview
Interview with Tracy Hessler, at iUniverse
Orlando Weekly: "Afterwords," by Steve Schneider

1959 births
20th-century American novelists
21st-century American novelists
American fantasy writers
American horror writers
American male novelists
American people who self-identify as being of Native American descent
Living people
People from Florida
United States Air Force airmen
20th-century American male writers
21st-century American male writers